Adedamola Richard Kasunmu  (popularly known as ARK) is a Nigerian politician and member of Lagos State House of Assembly representing Ikeja constituency II. Adedamola has been a member of the State House of Assembly since 2015.

Political career 
Kasunmu was born on 29 March 1983. 1n 2015, he was elected as a lawmaker representing Ikeja constituency II under the All Progressives Congress party and was chairman of the Lagos State House of Assembly Committee on Youth and Social Development. He is a nephew of Bola Ahmed Tinubu, the national leader of the All Progressives Congress in Nigeria. As a lawmaker, Kasumu became the only first-term lawmaker in the 8th assembly of the state to sponsor two executive bills that were passed into law. The bills were passed into law for the establishment of Lagos State Sports Commission and Lagos State Sports Trust Fund. As a legislator from the 8th assembly from Ikeja constituency II, Kasumu facilitated the admission of 27 students of Lagos State University and 65 youths into the Lagos State Civil Service between 2015 and 2018. In 2018, he sponsored 100 students for Joint Admissions and Matriculation Board exams into Nigerian universities and polytechnics. In 2016/2017, two members of his constituency were sent to the US and Scotland for Leadership training.

References 

Living people
Yoruba politicians
1983 births
Politicians from Lagos